{{Infobox valley
| photo         = 2022-03-24 19 45 38 UTC minus 7 View north from an airplane across northwestern Nye County, Nevada, with Big Smoky Valley in the center, the Toquima Range to the upper right and the Toiyabe Range to the upper left.jpg
| photo_caption = Aerial view of Big Smoky Valley looking north
| photo_size = 300px
| country = United States
| state = Nevada
| region  = Northern and SouthernBig Smoky Valley watersheds
| location = saddle of drainage divide(south of the Hadley Airport)
| coordinates   = 
| capital_coordinates = 
| mouth_coordinates = 
| area_mi2 = 4960
| area_note     = (watersheds' area)
| footnotes = 
| map = Nevada
| map_size = 
| map_caption = Location of Big Smoky Valley in Nevada
}}
The Big Smoky Valley is a landform of the Tonopah Basin between the Toiyabe and Toquima mountain ranges.  It is about 100 miles (160 km) in length.

Big Smoky Valley was so named on account of haze which frequently settles there. It is known by other names (some with different spellings): including Great Smoky Valley, Smokey Valley, Smoky Valley, Wen-A-No-Nu-Fee Valley, and Won-A-No-Nu-Fee Valley.  The U.S. Geological Survey usually refers to it as "Big Smoky Valley," but the chamber of commerce in the valley calls itself the Greater Smoky Valley Chamber of Commerce''.

Approximately 2,500 people live in the valley, which has seven small communities. There is an open-pit gold mine at the southern end of the valley, and local industry includes mining, agriculture, and ranching. The valley traverses three counties: Esmeralda, Nye, and Lander. The North and South Twin Rivers flow into the Big Smoky Valley—the latter at an elevation of —and the water is completely diverted except during periods of high flow.

References

External links

 Photographs of the Big Smoky Valley

Valleys of Nevada
Valleys of Nye County, Nevada
Valleys of Esmeralda County, Nevada
Landforms of Lander County, Nevada